is a military aerodrome of the Japan Ground Self-Defense Force .

References

Airports in Japan
Japan Ground Self-Defense Force bases
Transport in Tochigi Prefecture
Buildings and structures in Tochigi Prefecture
Utsunomiya